Grimm Tales or Grim Tales may refer to:
 Grimm Tales (album), an album by Nox Arcana
 Grimm Tales (play), a play by Carol Ann Duffy
 Grim Tales, a British children's television program
 Grim Tales, a series of hidden object games for PC from Elephant Games
 Grim Tales from Down Below, a webcomic series by Snafu Comics

See also
 Grimms' Fairy Tales, a collection of fairy tales by the Brothers Grimm
 Grimm (disambiguation)